Choi Duk-hoon (also Choi Deok-hun, ; born March 5, 1976, in Seoul) is a retired amateur South Korean Greco-Roman wrestler, who competed in the men's middleweight category. He produced a remarkable tally of three career medals, including a gold in the 74-kg division at the 2003 Asian Wrestling Championships in Delhi, India, and also finished tenth at the 2004 Summer Olympics, representing his nation South Korea. Having worked as a full-time employee for Sung Shin, Choi trained throughout his sporting career as a member of its wrestling team under head coach Bang Dae-du.

Choi highlighted his sporting career at the 2003 Asian Wrestling Championships in Delhi, India, where he captured a gold medal over India's Sanjay Kumar in the 74-kg division with a comfortable 7–0 decision.

At the 2004 Summer Olympics in Athens, Choi qualified for the South Korean squad, as a 28-year-old, in the men's 74 kg class. Earlier in the process, he placed third in the same class at the Asian Championships in Almaty, Kazakhstan to guarantee a spot on South Korea's Olympic wrestling team. He lost his opening match 2–6 to two-time reigning Olympic champion Filiberto Azcuy of Cuba, but bounced back to oust Poland's Radosław Truszkowski with a challenging 6–1 verdict. Placing second in the prelim pool and tenth overall, Choi failed to advance to the quarterfinals.

References

External links
 

1976 births
Living people
Olympic wrestlers of South Korea
Wrestlers at the 2004 Summer Olympics
Sport wrestlers from Seoul
Wrestlers at the 2006 Asian Games
South Korean male sport wrestlers
Asian Games competitors for South Korea
Asian Wrestling Championships medalists
20th-century South Korean people
21st-century South Korean people